Eastern Sambo is a coral reef located within the Florida Keys National Marine Sanctuary. It lies to the south of Boca Chica Key.  It is designated "Research Only".

See also
Western Sambo

References

External links
 Benthic Habitat Map
 NOAA National Marine Sanctuary Maps, Florida Keys East
 NOAA Navigational Chart 11446

Coral reefs of the Florida Keys